David James Mims (born July 7, 1970) is a former American football wide receiver in the National Football League for the Atlanta Falcons from 1993−1994. He was signed by the Falcons as an undrafted free agent in 1993. He played college football at Baylor.

Mims was drafted in the 30th round (60th overall) of the 1995 NFL Expansion Draft by the Carolina Panthers, but was waived before the start of the 1995 season.

His cousin is Keyarris Garrett, a wide receiver for Tulsa, who went undrafted in 2016.  His son David Mims II played cornerback for Texas State and signed as an undrafted free agent with Atlanta Falcons before being released with an injury settlement.

References

1970 births
Living people
Players of American football from Texas
American football running backs
American football wide receivers
Baylor Bears football players
Atlanta Falcons players
Carolina Panthers players